The Chester Half Marathon is an annual road running event held in the city of Chester, United Kingdom. 
It was first run in 1982  using a route that started and finished at the Chester Racecourse via Blacon, Saughall and Sealand. In 1993 the race was organized by Chester and Ellesmere Port Athletic Club, who moved the route to the south of the City went out and back via Eccleston, Belgrave and Pulford. West Cheshire AC took over in 1998 and in 2012 Active Leisure Events provided the organization with a new route finishing outside the town hall and Chester Cathedral.

Past winners

References

External links
 Official website

Half marathons in the United Kingdom
Recurring sporting events established in 1982
1982 establishments in England
Sport in Cheshire
May sporting events